Shelly Kishore is an Indian film and television actress. She is known for her role Shalini in Kumkumapoovu and in Thanga Meenkal and Usha in Minnal Murali. She received a Kerala state television award for best actress in 2006.

Early life 
Her father, J. Nabu Kumar, is a civil engineer in Dubai, United Arab Emirates. Her mother Sheela is a homemaker. She has an elder brother and a sister. Shelly's brother is married and lives in the US. Her sister, Shibily works as a teacher.

Shelly studied in Muscat and in New Indian Model School, Dubai. She has a diploma in mass media and communication from Singapore and another diploma in sociology. Shelly has completed her Post Graduation in E-Governance.

Career

Shelly Kishore received the Government of Kerala's award for the best actress in 2006 for her role in the serial Thaniye, telecasted in Amrita TV. Shelly's first Malayalam movie was Kerala Cafe, directed by Shankar Ramakrishnan. Shelly's first Tamil movie was Thanga Meenkal, directed by Ram. Shelly appeared the Hindi movie The Waiting Room, directed by Maneej Premnath. She learned classic Indian dance forms, including Mohiniyattam, Kuchipudi, and Bharatanatyam.

Shelly was selected as the second runner up for the Miss Flower Show contest held at Kanakakunnu, Trivandrum. Shelly acted in the Malayalam movie Kanalkannadi directed by Jayan Poduval, although it was never released. Kishore is famous in Malayali households for her portrayal of Shalini Rudran in Kumkumapoovu. After finishing that production, she took a break from television. In 2017 she came back through the portrayal of Balasuda in Sthreepadam.

Filmography

Serials

Short films
 Chirakinte Maravil

Awards

References

External links
 

Living people
Year of birth missing (living people)
Kerala State Television Award winners
Actresses in Malayalam television
Actresses in Malayalam cinema
Actresses in Tamil cinema
Actresses in Hindi cinema